The Communist and Allies Group was a communist political group with seats in the European Parliament between 1973 and 1989.

History
The "Communist and Allies Group" was the first communist group in the European Parliament, founded on 16 October 1973. 

The Communist and Allies Group included MEPs from the Communist parties of France and Italy.

It stayed together until 25 July 1989 when it split into two groups, "Left Unity" (LU) with 14 members and the "Group for the European United Left" (EUL) with 28 members.

Sources
Development of Political Groups in the European Parliament
EUL/NGL on Europe Politique
Democracy in the European Parliament
European Parliament MEP Archives

References

Former European Parliament party groups
Communist parties in Europe